Trini is a term for Trinidadians and Tobagonians.

Trini may also refer to:

People
 Trini Alvarado (born 1967), American actress
 Trini Lopez (1937–2020), American singer, guitarist, and actor
 Trini Triggs (born 1965), American country music singer
 Mari Trini (1947–2009), Spanish pop singer and actress born Maria Trinidad Perez Miravete
 Matteo Trini (born 1987), Italian footballer

Fictional characters
 Trini Kwan, the Yellow Power Ranger from Mighty Morphin Power Rangers
 Trini, either of two dolls in the Groovy Girls doll line by Manhattan Toy